Rebecca Enonchong    (born in July 14, 1967) is a Cameroonian technology entrepreneur and also the founder and CEO of AppsTech. She is best known for her work promoting technology in Africa.

Enonchong has been a recipient of various awards from organizations such as the World Economic Forum. Forbes listed her as one of the 10 Female Tech Founders To Watch In Africa during 2014.

Early life and education

Enonchong was born in the Southwest Region of Cameroon in 1967. Her father was Dr. Henry Ndifor Abi Enonchong, who was a well-known barrister in Cameroon. While Enonchong was growing up in Cameroon, her father helped create the Federal Cameroon Bar Association and its successor, the Cameroon Bar Association.

In her teens, Enonchong moved to the US with her family. While studying, she took up a job selling door-to-door newspaper subscriptions from the age of 15. She later became a manager at the same company at the age of 17.

Enonchong attended the Catholic University of America, where she graduated with a Bachelor of Science degree and also a Master of Science degree in Economics.

Career

After finishing her education, Enonchong went on to work for a number of organizations including Inter-American Development Bank (IaDB) and Oracle Corporation.

In 1999, Enonchong founded the company AppsTech, a Bethesda, Maryland-based global provider of enterprise application solutions. AppsTech is an Oracle Platinum Partner and has customers in over 40 countries.

AppsTech opened offices in several countries, including Enonchong's native Cameroon. She describes the experience as having been difficult and having led to the closure of AppsTech subsidiaries.

In 2002, The World Economic Forum of Davos, Switzerland named Enonchong a Global Leader for Tomorrow (GLT) along with other tech entrepreneurs such as Google co-founder Larry Page and Salesforce.com CEO Marc Benioff.

In 2013, Enonchong was recognized as a finalist for the African digital woman award. In March 2014, Forbes listed her as one of the ‘10 Female Tech Founders to Watch in Africa’.

Enonchong has also gained notoriety as one of the more followed sources for African tech news on Twitter, with over 30 thousand followers. Her handle, @Africatechie, has become a nickname for Enonchong in IT circles.

In August 2021, Rebecca Enonchong was arrested and taken into custody in Douala. Her lawyers denounce a "serious abuse of authority" on the part of the judicial system.

Non-profit work

Enonchong has spent much of her career promoting technology in Africa. She has carried out the work in both the U.S. and in Africa. She was the founder and Chairperson of the Africa Technology Forum, a non-profit dedicated to helping technology startups in Africa.

Enonchong is a member of the board of directors for the Salesforce.com Foundation. She is on the board of VC4Africa, which is one of the largest online communities in Africa that is dedicated to entrepreneurs and investors. She is a member of the UK Department for International Development's Digital Advisory Panel, and was previously involved with the UN’s Women Global Advisory Committee and the United Nations ICT Task Force.

Recognition

 Elected International Fellow, UK Royal Academy of Engineering, 2022.
 Forbes - 50 Over 50: EMEA Award (2022)
 Business Insider - Female Leader of the Year in Africa (2022)
 Black Enterprise – 2014 Women of Power
 IT News Africa – 10 Africans making waves in technology (2014)
 Forbes – 10 Female Tech Founders To Watch In Africa (2014)
 Digital Women – African Digital Woman of the Year Finalist (2013)
 WIE (Women, Inspiration and Enterprise Network) – 2013 WIE Africa Power Woman 
 New African – 50 Leading Women in Business in 2013 
 World Economic Forum – Global Leader for Tomorrow (2002)
 African Folder – African Female Founders You Should Know In 2023

References

External links
 https://twitter.com/africatechie?ref_src=twsrc%5Egoogle%7Ctwcamp%5Eserp%7Ctwgr%5Eauthor
 https://www.linkedin.com/in/rebeccaenonchong

Cameroonian emigrants to the United States
1967 births
Catholic University of America alumni
American women in business
Businesspeople in technology
Living people
21st-century American women
Fellows of the Royal Academy of Engineering
Female Fellows of the Royal Academy of Engineering